The 2016 United Women's Lacrosse League season, the first in the history of the UWLX, started on May 28, 2016 and ended with the league championship game on July 31, 2016 in which the Long Island Sound defeated the Boston Storm in a 13-8 final.

The first game in league history took place on May 28, 2016 at Goodman Stadium at Lehigh University in Bethlehem, Pennsylvania. Opposing the Baltimore Ride, Long Island prevailed by a 13-12 tally. The team's first-ever goal was scored by McKinley Curro, who would also score the league's first-ever two-point goal. Devon Wills served as the starting goaltender, allowing the first goal in UWLX history to Baltimore's Beth Glaros, while also registering the first win in league history.

Offseason

2016 UWLX Draft results
In the inaugural draft, Maryland Terrapins alumnus and former US national team player Katie Schwarzmann would be the first ever player selected, taken by the Baltimore Ride with the top pick. Other players selected in the first round of the inaugural draft were also current or former members of the US national team. Said players included Liz Hogan (Boston), Michelle Tumolo (Philly) and Devon Wills (Long Island).

Baltimore Ride

Long Island Sound

Philly Force 

Boston Storm

Regular season
June 10: Alex Aust of the Baltimore Ride set a UWLX record for most goals in one game with six. Of note, Aust would record a hat trick in the first and second half of the contest against the Boston Storm.

League standings

League leaders

Regular season scoring

Goaltending leaders
The following reflect regular season statistics

Schedule

Postseason
Inaugural Championship Weekend was held on July 31 on Homewood Field at Johns Hopkins University in Baltimore, Maryland.  The Long Island Sound defeated the Boston Storm, 13-8.  The Sound's goalkeeper, Devon Wills (#3), was named MVP.

Trivia: the semi-final games were originally scheduled to be played on Friday, July 30, but they were both rescheduled due to a thunderstorm - the underway results of the Sound vs Force game were vacated (the Sound were leading 5-4 before the initial lightning delay), and all three games were played on July 31.

Awards and honors

All-Star teams
On August 31, 2016, the league named its All-Star Team, as the Long Island Sound featured the most players named, with 10.
 
Attack position

Midfield position

Defense position

Goaltending position

References

External links

United Women's Lacrosse League